is an arcade collectible card cooking game developed and published by Examu. The game was created to commemorate the 50th anniversary of Sanrio and features various characters from the Sanrio Company, including ones from the anime series. The game was released in Japan on July 26, 2010 and has been into several revisions during its release. Starting with the revision in 2012, the game is tied to both the Jewelpet and Arcana Heart franchises.

An iOS version was released on June 13, 2012, featuring six playable characters. Another port of the game titled  is also released on the Nintendo 3DS on December 12, 2013. The game was released in Europe on November 6, 2015 as Hello Kitty and the Apron of Magic Rhythm Cooking, and in North America on January 28, 2016 as Hello Kitty's Magic Apron.

Gameplay
Apron of Magic involves using special collectible cards, which needs to be scanned first in the arcade machine, with the gameplay is done by using the touchscreen. The cards to be scanned in order is the character cards (Red), the ingredient card (Yellow) and, lastly, a Magic Power Card (Blue) in exact order, though there is a time limit and the player can scan as many cards as they can. The player then needs to follow some steps in the game to make sure the food has been prepared and cooked well in the process. Presentation and tasting were done in the end. If the player fails in one of those steps, the dish the player will cook will not end well.

Characters
In commemoration to the 50th anniversary of the company, Sanrio included several characters which gets expanded later on in each revision. More characters are also added in each revision, making it have the highest number of Sanrio characters that ever debuted in the game. Heart Aino and Saki Tsuzura, characters from EXAMU's fighting game Arcana Heart, also appear in the game as playable cameo characters.

Notes

References

External links
 Official website
 Official North American website

2010 video games
Card games introduced in 2010
Arcade video games
Collectible card games
Digital collectible card games
Cooking video games
Video games developed in Japan
Hello Kitty video games
Jewelpet
Single-player video games
Rising Star Games games
Lightweight (company) games
Examu games